Kurokawa may refer to:

Places
 Kurokawa, Niigata
 Kurokawa District, Miyagi
 Kurokawa Domain

Other uses
 Kurokawa (surname)
 , a manga publisher in France
 Siege of Kurokawa
 Kurokawa Station (disambiguation)
 10365 Kurokawa
 Kurokawa Dam
 Ogisai Kurokawa Noh